Michael Burnette McGee (December 1, 1938 – August 16, 2019) was an American offensive guard in the National Football League (NFL) who later became a successful college football coach and college athletics administrator. He was an All-American at Duke University and in 1959 won the Outland Trophy, given to the nation's best interior lineman. After playing for the St. Louis Cardinals from 1960 to 1962, he returned as an assistant coach to Duke, and then at the University of Minnesota and the University of Wisconsin–Madison, before becoming head coach at East Carolina University (1970) and Duke (1971–1978). At East Carolina, he compiled a 3–8 record, and at Duke he compiled a 37–47–4 record. His overall record as a head coach was 40–55–4. His best seasons came in 1971 and 1974, when he went 6–5. He later became athletic director at the University of Cincinnati (1980–1984), the University of Southern California (1984–1993), and the University of South Carolina (1993–2005). McGee was inducted into the College Football Hall of Fame as a player in 1990. He died in 2019 at the age of 80.

University of South Carolina 
McGee's years at the University of South Carolina were arguably his most successful. The university did not previously have a significant history of success. Before McGee's arrival, the Gamecocks had won no national championships.

McGee's goal was to build a foundation to foster athletic success for years to come. Upon his retirement, his accomplishments at the University of South Carolina included:

After winning only one football bowl game previously, the Gamecocks won three straight bowl games, including back-to-back Outback Bowl Championships against Ohio State. Those two victories catapulted the school to consecutive Top 20 national finishes, a first in the history of the program. Included in that stretch (2000–01) were the most wins (17) in consecutive years in the history of the football program.
McGee's ability to attract and hire high-caliber coaches. Among his hires at South Carolina were Curtis Frye (track and field), Lou Holtz (football), Ray Tanner (baseball), Dave Odom (men's basketball) and Steve Spurrier (football). Over McGee's final eight seasons, 13 Gamecock head coaches had earned either National Coach of the Year or Southeastern Conference Coach of the Year accolades.
Overseeing a dramatic increase in the athletics department's overall revenue, rising from approximately $18 million when he first came to South Carolina, to $52.8 million in fiscal year 2004.
The women's track team won the school's first national team championship, claiming the 2002 NCAA Outdoor title.
The baseball team made three straight appearances in the College World Series and was the winningest program in the country over McGee's final five seasons.
In 2000, for the first time in the history of the Southeastern Conference, South Carolina had three athletes named National Athlete of the Year in their respective sports: Kip Bouknight (baseball); Terrence Trammell (men's indoor and outdoor track); and Miki Barber (women's outdoor track).
Winning eight SEC team championships, including baseball (3), women's outdoor track (2), men's basketball (1), softball (1), and women's golf (1).
More than $110 million in facility improvements, including the 18,000-seat Colonial Center and a major expansion of Williams-Brice Stadium.

Head coaching record

References

External links
 
 

1938 births
2019 deaths
American football offensive guards
Cincinnati Bearcats athletic directors
Duke Blue Devils football coaches
Duke Blue Devils football players
St. Louis Cardinals (football) players
East Carolina Pirates football coaches
Minnesota Golden Gophers football coaches
South Carolina Gamecocks athletic directors
USC Trojans athletic directors
Wisconsin Badgers football coaches
College Football Hall of Fame inductees
People from Elizabeth City, North Carolina
Coaches of American football from North Carolina
Players of American football from North Carolina
Players of American football from Washington, D.C.